Niechanowo  is a village in Gniezno County, Greater Poland Voivodeship, in west-central Poland. It is the seat of the gmina (administrative district) called Gmina Niechanowo.

The village has a population of 2,300.

References

Villages in Gniezno County